Cardeñuela Riopico is a municipality located in the province of Burgos, Castile and León, Spain.

Demographics
According to the 2007 census (INE), the municipality has a population of 111 inhabitants.

References

External links
Asociación Cultural Valle Del Rio Pico 

Municipalities in the Province of Burgos